Hexadactilia borneoensis is a moth of the family Pterophoridae. It is known from Borneo.

Deuterocopinae